The 1997 FIBA EuroLeague Final Four was the 1996–97 season's FIBA EuroLeague Final Four tournament, organized by FIBA Europe.

Olympiacos won its first title, after defeating FC Barcelona Banca Catalana.

Bracket

Semifinals

Smelt Olimpija – Olympiacos

FC Barcelona Banca Catalana – ASVEL

Third-place game

Final

Awards

FIBA EuroLeague Final Four MVP 
  David Rivers ( Olympiacos)

FIBA EuroLeague Finals Top Scorer 
  David Rivers ( Olympiacos)

FIBA EuroLeague All-Final Four Team

References

External links 
 EuroLeague 1996–97 at FIBA Europe website
 EuroLeague at Linguasport

1996–97
International basketball competitions hosted by Italy
1996–97 in European basketball
1996–97 in Italian basketball
1996–97 in Spanish basketball
1996–97 in Slovenian basketball
1996–97 in French basketball
1996–97 in Greek basketball
Sports competitions in Rome
1990s in Rome
Basketball in Rome